|}

The Prix Dollar is a Group 2 flat horse race in France open to thoroughbreds aged three years or older. It is run at Longchamp over a distance of 1,950 metres (about 1 mile and 1¾ furlongs), and it is scheduled to take place each year in late September or early October.

History
The event is named after Dollar, a successful racehorse and sire in the 19th century. It was established in 1905, and was initially contested over 3,500 metres in the autumn. It was moved to the spring and cut to 2,200 metres in 1909. It was abandoned throughout World War I, with no running from 1915 to 1918.

In 1934, the race was titled the Prix du Centenaire to commemorate the centenary of the sport's main governing body at that time, the Société d'Encouragement. The Prix du Centenaire was a 2,100-metre handicap with a prize of 318,600 francs.

The Prix Dollar was cancelled from 1940 to 1943 because of World War II. It was staged at Le Tremblay with a distance of 2,150 metres in 1944 and 1945. For a period it was restricted to horses aged four or older.

The race was shortened to 2,000 metres in 1957, and extended to 2,250 metres in 1958. It reverted to 2,000 metres in 1960, and was held at Chantilly in 1965 and 1966. A new distance of 1,950 metres was introduced in 1969.

The Prix Dollar was run at Chantilly's Prix du Jockey Club meeting over 2,000 metres in 1986. It was switched to Longchamp's late September fixture in 1987. It was opened to three-year-olds and moved to the Saturday of Prix de l'Arc de Triomphe weekend in 1988. The latter race is traditionally held on the first Sunday of October.

Records
Most successful horse (3 wins):
 Cirrus des Aigles – 2010, 2012, 2013

Leading jockey (6 wins):
 Freddie Palmer – Priolo (1949), Flocon (1950), Violaine (1951), Montaval (1957), Javelot (1960), Fast Dip (1964)

Leading trainer (7 wins):
 Percy Carter – Kiss Curl (1938), Le Temeraire (1939), Priolo (1949), Flocon (1950), Violaine (1951), Javelot (1960), Fast Dip (1964)
 André Fabre – Al Nasr (1982), Mourtazam (1984), Creator (1989), Wiorno (1991), State Shinto (1999), Byword (2011), Fractional (2014)

Leading owner (5 wins):
 Sheikh Mohammed – Creator (1989), Knifebox (1993), Flemensfirth (1995, 1996), State Shinto (1999)

Winners since 1974

Earlier winners

 1905: Gouvernant
 1906: Kazbek
 1907: Eider / Procope
 1908: Arga
 1909: Biniou
 1910: Sea Sick
 1911: Italus
 1912: Basse Pointe
 1913: El Tango
 1914: Mon Petiot
 1915–18: no race
 1919: Samourai
 1920: King's Cross
 1921: Zagreus
 1922: Zagreus
 1923: Grillemont
 1924: Premontre
 1925: Lotus Lily
 1926: Inaudi
 1927: Rialto
 1928: Bacchus
 1929: Renardine
 1930: Sulpicio
 1931: Picaflor
 1932: Tchang Ti
 1933: Bracken
 1934: Pulcherrimus
 1935: Amontillado
 1936: Cerealiste
 1937: Dilemne
 1938: Kiss Curl
 1939: Le Temeraire
 1940–43: no race
 1944: Alfaraz
 1945:
 1946: Kerlor
 1947: Hassan
 1948: Goody
 1949: Priolo
 1950: Flocon
 1951: Violaine
 1952: Free Man
 1953:
 1954: Marcilly
 1955: Le Geographe
 1956: Tribord
 1957: Montaval
 1958: Apostol
 1959: Hamanet
 1960: Javelot
 1961: Bondolfi
 1962: Bondolfi
 1963: Wild Hun
 1964: Fast Dip
 1965: Corfinio
 1966: Tajubena
 1967: Great Nephew
 1968: Grandier
 1969: Semillant
 1970: Priamos
 1971: Caro
 1972: Sharapour
 1973: Gift Card

See also
 List of French flat horse races

References

 France Galop / Racing Post:
 galop.courses-france.com:
 1950–1979, 1980–present

 france-galop.com – A Brief History: Prix Dollar.
 galopp-sieger.de – Prix Dollar.
 horseracingintfed.com – International Federation of Horseracing Authorities – Prix Dollar (2018).
 pedigreequery.com – Prix Dollar – Longchamp.

Horse races in France
Longchamp Racecourse
Open middle distance horse races
Recurring sporting events established in 1905
1905 establishments in France